Pedro José Moreira da Silva (born 13 February 1997) is a Portuguese professional footballer who plays for G.D. Estoril Praia as a goalkeeper.

Club career
Born in Sintra, Lisbon District, Silva joined Sporting CP's youth system in 2009, aged 12. 8 August 2015, he made his senior debut with their reserves, in a 0–0 home draw against C.D. Feirense in the Segunda Liga.

Silva appeared in ten matches in the 2017–18 season, as his team were relegated after finishing in 18th position. On 8 July 2018, he was loaned to Primeira Liga club C.D. Tondela. During his spell at the Estádio João Cardoso, he played four games in all competitions.

On 10 January 2020, Danish 1st Division side HB Køge announced that they had signed Silva on a contract until summer 2022. He returned to his country on 18 July 2020, agreeing a to a two-year deal at newly-promoted F.C. Vizela. He contributed 15 appearances in his first season in another promotion, but subsequently spent four months on the sidelines due to a right-foot syndesmosis injury.

Silva made his debut in the Portuguese top flight on 28 December 2021, in a 2–0 away loss to C.S. Marítimo. He retained his place until the end of the campaign, and the side managed to avoid relegation.

In August 2022, Silva joined G.D. Estoril Praia on a three-year contract.

References

External links

1997 births
Living people
People from Sintra
Sportspeople from Lisbon District
Portuguese footballers
Association football goalkeepers
Primeira Liga players
Liga Portugal 2 players
Sporting CP B players
C.D. Tondela players
F.C. Vizela players
G.D. Estoril Praia players
HB Køge players
Portugal youth international footballers
Portuguese expatriate footballers
Expatriate men's footballers in Denmark
Portuguese expatriate sportspeople in Denmark